Drancy is a commune in the northeastern suburbs of Paris in the Seine-Saint-Denis department in northern France. It is located 10.8 km (6.7 mi) from the center of Paris.

History

Toponymy 
The name Drancy comes from Medieval Latin Derenciacum, and before that Terentiacum, meaning "estate of Terentius", a Gallo-Roman landowner.

Origins to 20th century 
In the 17th century, Drancy was divided into two distinct villages: Drancy le Grand and le Petit Drancy. The quarter "Village Parisien" is built on the old location of the hamlet of Groslay which was surrounded by the forest of Bondy—hence the name of rue des Bois de Groslay.

The end of nineteenth century was marked by the industrialisation and by the development of rail transports. During the Franco-Prussian war, Le Bourget was the site of an important battle  and the castle of Ladoucette in Drancy was destroyed.

20th and 21st centuries 

During World War II, Drancy was the site of the Drancy internment camp where Jews, Gypsies, and others were held before being shipped to the Nazi concentration camps. In 1976, the Memorial to the Deportation at Drancy was created by sculptor Shlomo Selinger to commemorate the French Jews imprisoned in the camp.

Population

Immigration

Heraldry

Geography and cityscape

Climate
  Data climate for Le Bourget (Seine-Saint-Denis) 1971-2000

Architecture 
Drancy's buildings are too diverse to be characterised by any particular architectural style. Some of them with a style Art Nouveau are typical of the 19th and 20th centuries. There are housing estates and a garden city.

Park and Castle of Ladoucette 

The parc de Ladoucette is the only park of Drancy. It contains a pond, a small educational farm and the castle of Ladoucette. The castle was built in 1533 by Pierre Séguier. In the 19th century, the castle was the property of the senator Charles-Loetitia de Ladoucette. In 1874 his wife, la Baronne de Ladoucette, died and her body was placed in the Mausoleum de la Baronne de Ladoucette. Today she is buried in the Parisian cemetery.

Administration
Part of the commune forms the canton of Drancy. The other part belongs to the canton of Le Blanc-Mesnil.

Transport

Railways and buses
Drancy is in Zone 3 of the Carte orange.
The city is served by Le Bourget station and by Drancy station on Paris RER line B. Le Bourget station is situated near Drancy as well as the métro station La Courneuve–8 mai 1945 on the Line 7. The RER B is one of the five lines in the RER Rapid transit system serving Paris and its suburbs.

Drancy is also served by the Paris Tramway Line 1 with five stops and by twelve buse lines.

By the RER B, Drancy is near many Parisian railway stations, Gare du Nord is now just 10 minutes away, Gare Saint-Lazare and Gare de Lyon can be reached in 30 minutes. Charles de Gaulle Airport can be reached in 30 minutes too.

Roads
Drancy is served by the A3 motorway and the A86 motorway.

Education
Schools:
17 public preschools (écoles maternelles)
19 public elementary schools
Six public junior high schools (collèges): Paul Bert, Anatole France, Jorissen, Paul Langevin, Liberte, Pierre Samard
One private junior high school, Collège Saint-Germain
Two public senior high schools/sixth-form colleges: Lycée Eugène Delacroix and Lycée Paul le Rolland

International relations
Drancy is twinned with:
 Willenhall
 Eisenhüttenstadt
 Gorée

See also
Communes of the Seine-Saint-Denis department

References

External links

 Official website 

Communes of Seine-Saint-Denis